The 1975 Air Canada Silver Broom was held at the Perth Ice Rink in Perth, Scotland from March 17–23, 1975.

Teams

Round-robin standings

Round-robin results

Draw 1

Draw 2

Draw 3

Draw 4

Draw 5

Draw 6

Draw 7

Draw 8

Draw 9

Playoffs

Semifinals

Final

References

External links
 

World Men's Curling Championship
Air Canada Silver Broom
Air Canada Silver Broom, 1975
Sport in Perth, Scotland
International curling competitions hosted by Scotland
Air Canada Silver Broom